Crime and Custom in Savage Society is a 1926 book by anthropologist Bronisław Malinowski.

The book is considered a seminal work in legal anthropology, described 75 years after its publication as having major "intellectual influence".

References

External links 
 Full text of Crime and Custom in Savage Society at the Internet Archive

1926 non-fiction books
Anthropology books
Non-fiction crime books
Sociology of law